Mikhail Kuznetsov may refer to:
Mikhail Kuznetsov (canoeist) (born 1985), Russian slalom canoeist
Mikhail Kuznetsov (rower) (born 1952), Russian rower
Mikhail Kuznetsov (pilot) (1913–1989), Soviet ace, double Hero of the Soviet Union
Mikhail Vladimirovich Kuznetsov (born 1988), figure skater
Mikhail Kuznetsov (triathlete) (born 1979), triathlete from Kazakhstan
Mikhail Kuznetsov (actor) (1918–1986), Soviet/Russian actor
Mikhail Sergeevich Kuznetsov (born 1978), Russian state, public and scientific figure
Mikhail Varfolomeyevich Kuznetsov, Russian politician, Governor of Pskov Oblast in Russia